Sello Motloung (born 4 November 1970), is a South African actor, presenter and MC. He is best known for the roles in the television serials such as; Backstage, Mamello and Ring of Lies.

Personal life
Motloung was born on 4 November 1970 in Meadowlands, South Africa.

Career
In 1998, he was nominated for the Best Supporting Actor Award at the M-Net All-Africa Film Award for his role in Chikin Biznis. In 2001, she appeared in the fifth season of the SABC1 education drama series Soul City. Then she played the role "Nkabi" in the SABC3 drama The Lab in 2006. In the same year, she made supporting roles in two more serials: season three of ITV series Wild at Heart with the role "Lungi" and CBC series Jozi-H with the role "Dumisani". In the preceding years, he appeared in many television serials such as; The Long Run, Ollie, Zulu Love Letter, Skilpoppe, Man to Man, Faith's Corner, Jerusalema, Invictus, Chanda's Secrets, Tirza and How to Steal 2 Million. Meanwhile, she played the role "Mpumi" in the e.tv soap opera Backstage. She continued to play the role for 18 months with popularity.

In 2004, he acted in the Canadian mini-series Human Cargo. In 2007, he joined with the SABC1 mini-series After Nine and played the role of "Kutloano Maema". In the same year, she played the lead role in the SABC1 Christmas Eve one hour teledrama Second Chance. In 2012, he played the lead role "David" in the e.tv drama series eKasi: Our Stories. In 2015, he joined with the cast of SABC2 drama Mamello and played the role "Mr Thobejane" for three seasons. In 2016, he joined with Mzansi Magic telenovela Ring of Lies to play the role "Thabelo". He reprised the role in second season in 2017.

Apart from cinema and television, he also made several theatre productions since 1990s, such as; Street Cleaners (1990), The Awakening (1991), The Good Woman of Sharkville (1996), The Cherry Orchard (1997), Master Harold And The Boys (1998), Cold Stone Jug (2004) and Socks & Toothpaste (2006). For his role in the play The Good Woman of Sharkville, he was nominated for a Vita Award for Best Supporting Actor as well.

Before the COVID-19 pandemic, he appeared in the SABC2 telenovela Lithapo where he played the role "Thapelo". After a drought in the drama industry due to the pandemic, he was seeking for new job opportunities. However, in 2021, he got the opportunity to play in the SABC3 telenovela The Estate with the role "Elias Nkosi".

Filmography

References

External links
 IMDb

1970 births
Living people
South African male film actors
South African male television actors
South African male stage actors